Eresiomera jacksoni, the Jackson's pearly, is a butterfly in the family Lycaenidae. It is found in Ivory Coast and Ghana. The habitat consists of forests.

References

Butterflies described in 1969
Poritiinae